Marty Schafer is a former American soccer player who played for Dayton Dynamo in the NPSL.

Career statistics

Club

Notes

References

Living people
American soccer players
Association football defenders
Dayton Dynamo players
Ohio Xoggz players
National Professional Soccer League (1984–2001) players
Year of birth missing (living people)